Babar "Bob" Saroya  (born February 3, 1952) is a former Canadian politician, who was elected to represent the riding of Markham—Unionville in the House of Commons of Canada in the 2015 Canadian federal election. During the 42nd Canadian Parliament he has been a member of the Conservative Party official opposition and sponsored one private member bill, C-338, An Act to amend the Controlled Drugs and Substances Act (punishment), which would have increased mandatory minimum sentences for those convicted of importing controlled drugs and substances. The bill was debated at second reading but defeated by the Liberals; only members from the Conservative Party voted in favour.

His election in 2015 was unique, Markham—Unionville was originally held by John McCallum who Saroya came close to upsetting in 2011. After re-distribution, McCallum chose to run in the neighbouring riding of Markham—Thornhill. Saroya's election was considered to be an anomaly because he was the only candidate in Canada to pick up a seat from the Liberals.

Saroya was re-elected in the 2019 Canadian federal election. During the ensuing 43rd Canadian Parliament he introduced one private member bill, Bill C-238, An Act to amend the Criminal Code (possession of unlawfully imported firearms) which sought to increase the minimum mandatory sentence from one year to five years imprisonment for the offense of possession of a firearm known to be illegally imported to Canada. It was brought to a vote on January 27, 2021, but defeated with NDP and Liberal Party members voting in against. In the 2020 Conservative Party of Canada leadership election he endorsed Peter MacKay.

Saroya immigrated to Canada from India in 1974. He eventually went on to own several restaurants and became a Director with a multi-billion dollar Canadian company before first running for office in 2008.

Electoral record

References

1952 births
Living people
Conservative Party of Canada MPs
Members of the House of Commons of Canada from Ontario
People from Markham, Ontario
Indian emigrants to Canada
Canadian politicians of Indian descent
Canadian politicians of Punjabi descent
21st-century Canadian politicians